The Cabinet of Giorgi Kvirikashvili may refer to one of the two successive cabinets of Georgia led by Giorgi Kvirikashvili:
 First Cabinet of Giorgi Kvirikashvili, 2015–2016
 Second Cabinet of Giorgi Kvirikashvili, 2016–2018